Hamilton Township is a township in Franklin County, Pennsylvania, United States. The population was 11,374 at the 2020 census, up from 8,949 at the 2000 census.

History
The township has the name of James Hamilton (1710–1783), mayor of Philadelphia and lieutenant-governor of Pennsylvania.

The Bridge between Guilford and Hamilton Townships was listed on the National Register of Historic Places in 1988.

Geography
Hamilton Township is in central Franklin County and is bordered to the northeast by the borough of Chambersburg, the county seat. South of Chambersburg, Conococheague Creek forms the eastern boundary of the township. Back Creek, a tributary of Conococheague, forms the southwestern boundary. The township extends northwest as far as the crest of Broad Mountain, the easternmost ridge in the Ridge-and-Valley Appalachians in this part of the state.

U.S. Route 30 crosses the center of the township, leading east into Chambersburg and west to McConnellsburg.

Neighboring Townships

  Antrim Township (south)
  Greene Township (northeast)
  Guilford Township (southeast)
  Letterkenny Township (north)
  St. Thomas Township (west)

Communities

  Cashtown
  Freys
  Hamilton Heights
  Housum
  Kensington Heights
  Pleasant View
  Sandy hook
  Turkeyfoot

Demographics

As of the census of 2000, there were 8,949 people, 3,476 households, and 2,648 families residing in the township.  The population density was 250.8 people per square mile (96.8/km2).  There were 3,612 housing units at an average density of 101.2/sq mi (39.1/km2).  The racial makeup of the township was 94.97% White, 2.57% African American, 0.11% Native American, 0.74% Asian, 0.08% Pacific Islander, 0.50% from other races, and 1.03% from two or more races. Hispanic or Latino of any race were 1.42% of the population.

There were 3,476 households, out of which 33.9% had children under the age of 18 living with them, 63.8% were married couples living together, 8.9% had a female householder with no husband present, and 23.8% were non-families. 18.9% of all households were made up of individuals, and 7.5% had someone living alone who was 65 years of age or older.  The average household size was 2.57 and the average family size was 2.93.

In the township the population was spread out, with 25.3% under the age of 18, 7.6% from 18 to 24, 29.0% from 25 to 44, 24.3% from 45 to 64, and 13.7% who were 65 years of age or older.  The median age was 37 years. For every 100 females there were 95.1 males.  For every 100 females age 18 and over, there were 93.3 males.

The median income for a household in the township was $43,153, and the median income for a family was $47,049. Males had a median income of $32,879 versus $25,082 for females. The per capita income for the township was $21,122.  About 4.9% of families and 6.3% of the population were below the poverty line, including 9.3% of those under age 18 and 4.9% of those age 65 or over.

References

Populated places established in 1737
Townships in Franklin County, Pennsylvania
1737 establishments in Pennsylvania